Kasakh is a village in the Kotayk Province of Armenia.

Notable people
Hripsime Khurshudyan, European champion in weightlifting

References 

World Gazeteer: Armenia – World-Gazetteer.com

Populated places in Kotayk Province